The Addams Family Values: Music from the Motion Picture album was released on Atlas Records in late 1993 to promote Addams Family Values, a sequel to the 1991 film The Addams Family.

Overview 
The album features several hip-hop and R&B based cover songs of 1970s funk/soul songs by artists, including:
 Charles & Eddie, who cover Ben E. King's "Supernatural Thing" (composed by Haras Fyre) 
 H-Town, who cover The Isley Brothers' "It's Your Thing"
 Shabba Ranks, Patra, and Terri & Monica, who cover Sly & the Family Stone's "Family Affair"
 R. Kelly and Mad Cobra (who cover Isaac Hayes' "Do Your Thing").

A remixed version of Tag Team's then-current hit "Whoomp! (There It Is)", "Addams Family (Whoomp!)", was used as the lead single.

Paramount Pictures had signed Michael Jackson to record a horror-themed song for the film and to promote it with a video. In an attempt to cope with the negative publicity from accusations of child molestation, Jackson turned to prescription drugs and had to undergo a lengthy rehabilitation. He was unable to finish the video and his song, "Is It Scary", was dropped from the film. The song was included on his 1997 album Blood on the Dance Floor (HIStory in the Mix); the video project was finished, independently, as the short film Ghosts.

Track listing 
 "It's Your Thing", performed by H-Town – 3:59
 "Be Thankful for What You Got", performed by Portrait – 4:37
 "Express Yourself", performed by Roger and Fu-Schnickens – 5:31
 "Whatcha See Is Whatcha Get", performed by RuPaul – 4:50
 "Family Affair", performed by Shabba Ranks, Patra, with Terri & Monica – 4:29
 "Night People", performed by Brian McKnight – 4:29
 "Supernatural Thing", performed by Charles & Eddie – 4:35
 "Do Your Thing (Love On)", performed by R. Kelly and Mad Cobra – 4:35
 "Do It Any Way You Wanna (It's on You)", performed by Guru – 4:28
 "May You Always Drink Bizarre", performed by P.M. Dawn – 3:23
 "Addams Family (Whoomp!)", performed by Tag Team – 3:50

References 

The Addams Family music
1993 soundtrack albums
Comedy film soundtracks